Sunways was a charter airline consisting of sister companies Sunways Airlines A.B. (SWY), based in Stockholm, Sweden, and SUNWAY Intersun Havacilik Anonim Sirketi (SWW), based at Istanbul-Atatürk and Antalya, Turkey. The airline was in operation from March 1995 to October 1997.

History 
Sunways was owned by Tursem A.S., a now defunct travel group based in Istanbul, Turkey. The group was founded in 1985 by Haluk Semiz and Nedim Gürbüz but went bankrupt on 4 October 1997, prompting Sunways to cease operation.

Fleet 
The Sunway Intersun Havacilik Turkey-based fleet included 4 MD-83 aircraft.

The Sunways Sweden-based fleet included 4 Boeing 757-200 aircraft.

Destinations 
Sunways operated destinations including the following:
	
Sweden
Stockholm
Göteborg
Örebro
Umeå
Luleå
Sundsvall
Malmö
Jönköping
Visby
Västerås
Nyköping
Thailand
Phuket
Turkey
Istanbul
Antalya
Izmir
Dalaman
U.A.E.
Dubai
India
Goa
Finland
Helsinki
Oulu
Kokkola
Turku
Tampere
Jyväskylä
Norway
Oslo
Bergen
Tromsø
Trondheim
Stavanger
Kirkenes
Denmark
Copenhagen
Aalborg
Billund
Esbjerg
Karup
Greece
Corfu
Rhodes
Heraklion
Samos
Spain
Las Palmas
Tenerife
Fuerteventura
Arrecife
Palma
Kenya
Mombasa
Tunisia
Monastir
Egypt
Sharm el-Sheikh

References

External links 
Sunways' Logo

Defunct airlines of Turkey
Defunct charter airlines of Turkey
Airlines established in 1995
Airlines disestablished in 1997